The CAMS 32R was an amphibious reconnaissance flying boat  flown in the early 1920s. It used a monocoque fuselage.

Specifications

References

Flying boats
Amphibious aircraft
CAMS aircraft
1920s French military reconnaissance aircraft
Aircraft first flown in 1923